The women's 400 metres at the 2012 European Athletics Championships were held at the Helsinki Olympic Stadium on 27, 28 and 29 June.

Medalists

Records

Schedule

Results

Round 1

First 3 in each heat (Q) and 4 best performers (q) advance to the Semifinals.

Semifinals
First 3 in each heat (Q) and 2 best performers (q) advance to the Final.

Final

References

 Round 1 Results
 Semifinal Results
 Final Results
Full results

400 W
400 metres at the European Athletics Championships
2012 in women's athletics